Proteiniphilum acetatigenes is a Gram-negative, rod-shaped, non-spore-forming, proteolytic, strictly anaerobic and motile bacterium from the genus of Proteiniphilum which has been isolated from granule sludge from a UASB reactor in China.

References

Further reading 
 

Bacteria described in 2005
Bacteroidia